Metallothionein-2 is a metallothionein protein that in humans is encoded by the MT2A gene. 

The single-nucleotide polymorphism rs28366003 which substitutes guanine for adenine in MT2A is associated with certain cancers and some chronic diseases.

Interactions
Metallothionein 2A has been shown to interact with protein kinase D1.

References

Further reading

Human proteins